Murray Winston Hall (born November 24, 1940) is a Canadian former professional ice hockey player who played in the National Hockey League and World Hockey Association during the 1960s and 1970s.

Playing career
A talented offensive winger, Hall was signed by the Chicago Black Hawks as a teenager and came up through their junior system, turning pro in 1961. In 1961–62, he scored 21 goals as the youngest player on the AHL Buffalo Bisons, Chicago's top minor-league affiliate, and appeared in his first two NHL games. Hall also received a surprising opportunity to play in the NHL All-Star Game, which at the time was between the defending Stanley Cup champions (Chicago won in 1961), and a team of all-stars from the rest of the league. Chicago took the opportunity to give Hall and Chico Maki, two of their top prospects, some valuable experience.

Over the next two seasons, Hall established himself as an elite minor-league scorer (playing on a line with and outscoring Phil Esposito in the EPHL in 1962–63), but struggled to take the next step to the NHL. In 1963–64, he scored just 2 points in 23 games in Chicago, and following the season was selected by the Detroit Red Wings in the intra-league draft. In Detroit, his fortunes would be much the same. He would lead easily lead the Wings' AHL affiliate in scoring over the next two years, but see only a few games of NHL action in Detroit. In 1966–67, he finally produced in NHL action, scoring 4 goals and 7 points in a 12-game stint in Detroit.

Selected by the Minnesota North Stars in the 1967 NHL Expansion Draft, Hall was expected to be a key part of their first-year squad, but struggled scoring just 3 points in 17 games, and his rights were dealt to the Toronto Maple Leafs. He was assigned to the Vancouver Canucks in 1968, and spent the following two seasons there.

In 1970, the owners of the Canucks were granted an NHL expansion franchise of the same name, and Hall was one of several players who stayed with the organization. This time, he would take advantage of his opportunity, scoring 21 goals and 38 assists for 59 points, good for 4th on the team in scoring and 2nd in assists. However, his scoring touch wouldn't last as he slumped to just 6 goals and 12 points in 32 games in 1971–72, and found himself back in the AHL.

Hall jumped to the upstart World Hockey Association for 1972–73, one of four Canucks (along with Ted Taylor, Poul Popiel, and John Schella) to sign with the Houston Aeros. He would rediscover his scoring touch in the WHA, scoring 70 points in his first year in Houston. With the arrival of Gordie Howe in 1973, Houston would dominate the WHA over the next two seasons, and Hall was a key component of teams which won back-to-back Avco Cup championships in 1974 and 1975, scoring an impressive 16 goals in 27 playoff games over those two years. Hall would spend one more season with Houston in 1975–76, and had a brief stint in the CHL before retiring in 1977.

In 164 NHL games, Hall recorded 35 goals and 48 assists for 83 points, along with 46 penalty minutes. In an additional 312 WHA contests, he netted 96 goals and added 125 assists for a total of 221 points, along with 155 penalty minutes.

Career statistics

Regular season and playoffs

External links 

1940 births
Living people
Buffalo Bisons (AHL) players
Canadian expatriate ice hockey players in the United States
Canadian ice hockey right wingers
Chicago Blackhawks players
Detroit Red Wings players
Houston Aeros (WHA) players
Ice hockey people from Ontario
Los Angeles Blades (WHL) players
Memphis South Stars players
Minnesota North Stars players
Oklahoma City Blazers (1965–1977) players
Pittsburgh Hornets players
Rochester Americans players
Sault Thunderbirds players
Sportspeople from Kirkland Lake
St. Catharines Teepees players
St. Louis Braves players
St. Louis Braves (EPHL) players
Vancouver Canucks players
Vancouver Canucks (WHL) players